Moira Lister Gachassin-Lafite, Viscountess of Orthez (6 August 192327 October 2007) was a South African-British film, stage and television actress and writer.

Early life 
Born in Cape Town to Major James Lister and Margaret (née Hogan), Lister was educated at the Parktown Convent of the Holy Family, Johannesburg. She was a  theatre student of Anna Romain Hoffman, who with her husband Arthur Hoffman founded The Johannesburg Repertory Theatre.

Career 
She began her acting career on stage in South Africa and then went on to act in the London theatre at the age of 18. Lister began working in films in 1943, and appeared in a number of films over several decades. The most notable of these being for Ealing Studios, such as Another Shore (1948),  (1949), Pool of London (1951) and The Cruel Sea (1953). She starred in Peter Ustinov's long-running 1951 play The Love of Four Colonels in the West End.

She had a regular role in the first series of the BBC radio comedy Hancock's Half Hour in 1954–55, and was also one of the girlfriends in A Life of Bliss starring George Cole as David Bliss, a perpetual bachelor.
She played Felicty Willow in BBC Radio’s comedy Mr Willows wife.She starred in the BBC television series The Whitehall Worrier and The Very Merry Widow from 1967 to 1968. (Later series of this programme were titled The Very Merry Widow — and How!) Lister also appeared on various other British TV series such as Danger Man and The Avengers ("The See-Through Man", 1967). In 1980, she made a guest appearance as a film star in the sitcom Only When I Laugh.

She was the subject of This Is Your Life in 1971 when she was surprised by Eamonn Andrews.

Lister was still performing until three years before her death, touring with her one-woman show about Noël Coward. She belonged to the British Catholic Stage Guild.

Personal life 
In 1946, Lister went on a date in London with Neville Heath, a former South African Air Force captain who murdered two women in London only months later. Heath was convicted after a sensational trial, and he was hanged in October 1946.

In 1951, Moira Lister married Belgo-French aristocrat Jacques Gachassin-Lafite, Viscount of Orthez, son of André Gachassin-Lafite, Viscount of Orthez and of Louise van Dievoet. Jacques was a French officer of the Spahis, owner of a champagne vineyard and hero of the Rif War; they had two daughters, Chantal and Christobel. Lister also had two granddaughters, Christina d'Orthez and Marina d'Orthez.

Moira Lister died at the age of 84 in 2007. Both she and her husband are interred in the churchyard of St Edward's Catholic Church in Sutton Green, Surrey.

Honours 
 Naledi Theatre Award, a lifetime achievement award for her services to the theatre in South Africa.
 Best Actress of the Year (1971)
 Freedom of the City of London (2000)

Filmography

Film

Television

Publications 
 The Very Merry Moira (1971)

Bibliography 
 « Lister, Moira », in : Oxford Dictionary of National Biography 2005–2008, Oxford : Oxford University Press, 2013, pp. 696–697 .

References

External links 

1923 births
2007 deaths
South African people of British descent
British film actresses
British radio actresses
British Roman Catholics
British television actresses
French vicomtesses
Deaths from cancer in South Africa
Actresses from London
Actresses from Cape Town
South African emigrants to the United Kingdom
South African Roman Catholics
20th-century British actresses
21st-century British actresses
20th-century English women
20th-century English people
21st-century English women
21st-century English people